Kirchen (Sieg) is a town and Luftkurort (climatic spa) in the district of Altenkirchen in the north of Rhineland-Palatinate, Germany. It is situated on the river Sieg, approx. 12 km southwest of Siegen. Among its notable features is the Freusburg castle.

Kirchen is the seat of the Verbandsgemeinde (collective municipality) Kirchen (Sieg).

Personalities 

 Jürgen Alzen (born 1962), automobile racing driver
 Uwe Alzen (born 1967), automobile racing driver
 Georg Bätzing (born 1961), Catholic clergyman, bishop of Limburg
 Christoph Klein (born 1964), pediatric oncologist and medical director of the  Haunersch Children 's Hospital of the Clinic of the University of Munich 
 Heinrich Kraemer (1842-1907), mayor, parliamentary and state parliament deputy
 Thomas Kraft (born 1988), soccer player
 Barbara Rudnik (1958-2009), actress
 Luca Stolz (born 1995), automobile racing driver

References

External links
Verbandsgemeinde Kirchen/Sieg

Altenkirchen (district)